Group B of the 1995 Fed Cup Americas Zone Group I was one of two pools in the Americas Zone Group I of the 1995 Fed Cup. Four teams competed in a round robin competition, with the top two teams advancing to the knockout stage and the bottom team being relegated down to Group II for 1996.

Paraguay vs. Cuba

Brazil vs. Chile

Paraguay vs. Chile

Brazil vs. Cuba

Paraguay vs. Brazil

Chile vs. Cuba

  placed last in the pool, and thus was relegated to Group II in 1996, where they placed second in their pool of seven.

See also
Fed Cup structure

References

External links
 Fed Cup website

1995 Fed Cup Americas Zone